Puramundekkadu Shri Mahadeva Temple is an ancient Hindu temple dedicated to Shiva is situated at Edappal of Malappuram District in Kerala state in India. The presiding deity of the temple is Shiva, located in main Sanctum Sanctorum, facing East. According to folklore, sage Parashurama has installed the idol. The temple is a part of the 108 famous Shiva temples in Kerala and one among the five Shiva temples around Guruvayoor.

See also
 108 Shiva Temples
 Temples of Kerala

References

108 Shiva Temples
Shiva temples in Kerala
Hindu temples in Malappuram district